Dejan Zavec (born 13 March 1976), best known as Jan Zaveck, is a Slovenian former professional boxer who competed from 2003 to 2015. He held the IBF welterweight title from 2009 to 2011, and challenged once for the WBA super-welterweight title in 2015. Zaveck is the only Slovenian boxer to have held a world title, and was named Slovenian Sportsperson of the Year in 2010.

Early life
Dejan Zavec was born in Trdobojci, Slovenia, then part of Yugoslavia. He spent his youth in Gabrnik in the Slovene Hills and in Ptuj. He developed an interest in boxing at an early age. As a teenager, he joined the boxing club in Maribor. Later he resided in Gabrnik and in the city of Magdeburg, Saxony-Anhalt, Germany.

In 2006, he graduated from the Faculty for Physical Education in Novi Sad, Serbia.

Professional career

Early career
Zavec started boxing at the age of 16. As an amateur, he fought in the 1995, 1997 and 1999 World championships.

Zavec turned professional in 2003, winning his first 26 fights. Early in his career, Zavec was briefly signed with Don King, but returned to Europe after the legendary promoter was unable to secure him bouts. Resuming his career in Germany with SES Boxing, Zavec earned a number of regional titles, including the WBO and IBF Inter-Continental and German (BDB) Welterweight Titles.

In 2008, Zavec traveled to Poland to meet Rafal Jackiewicz for the EBU European Welterweight Title. After twelve rounds, a controversial  split decision was announced in the Polish fighter's favor. The bout was Zavec's first professional loss.

IBF welterweight champion
On December 11, 2009, Zavec won the IBF welterweight title against South African Isaac Hlatshwayo in a stunning upset via knockout. With this victory, Zavec became Slovenia's first-ever boxing world champion.

Zavec defended the IBF welterweight title for the first time against Rodolfo Martínez in Ljubljana, performing at the Tivoli Hall. He won by technical knockout in the twelfth round when the referee stopped the fight.

On September 4, 2010, Zavec defended the IBF welterweight title the second time against mandatory challenger Rafał Jackiewicz at the Stožice Arena in Ljubljana. In defeating Jackiewicz, Zavec avenged what was his sole career loss at the time.

Zavec was expected to face the winner of Randall Bailey-Said Ouali IBF title-eliminator that took place December 10, 2010, but the bout was ruled a no-contest. With no mandatory challenger established, Zavec opted for an optional defense in Ljubljana. On February 18, 2011, Zavec defended the IBF welterweight title for the third time against #15-ranked Paul Delgado, performing again at the Stožice Arena, in front of 12,000 spectators. He won with a technical knockout in the fifth round, when the referee stopped the fight.

After discussions to fight Paulie Malignaggi on the Saul Alvarez-Ryan Rhodes undercard fell through, Zavec traveled to Biloxi, Mississippi to face former WBC light-welterweight champion Andre Berto on HBO on September 3, 2011. Despite being a 4-to-1 underdog coming into the fight, Zavec proved competitive; trading clean punches with Berto and earning praise from HBO's Roy Jones Jr. In the fifth round, a number of cuts opened on Zavec's face, which resulted in Zavec's corner waiving the fight off before the sixth round. The loss ended Zavec's reign as IBF welterweight champion.

Later career
After losing the IBF title, Zavec fought on for three more years; going the distance with future unified welterweight world champion Keith Thurman and challenging Erislandy Lara for the WBA and IBO Super Welterweight Titles in a TKO loss.

Zavec announced his retirement from boxing on March 13, 2016, at a press conference attended by Slovene President Borut Pahor.

Professional boxing record

References

External links

1976 births
Living people
Slovenian male boxers
International Boxing Federation champions
People from Ptuj
Sportspeople from Magdeburg
World welterweight boxing champions
Light-middleweight boxers